Beckley and Stowood is a civil parish in the South Oxfordshire district of Oxfordshire, England. According to the United Kingdom Census 2011 it had a population of 608 (an increase of 55 in 10 years) across its area of 9.17 km2. The parish settlements are Beckley and Stowood which is covered in the Beckley article, long being closely associated.

References

External links
Beckley and Stowood Parish Council

External links

Civil parishes in Oxfordshire